The inaugural Four Hills tournament was held in January 1953. It was in planning since 1949, but in the post-war years German athletes were not allowed to compete internationally. The organizers were German and Austrian ski jumpers who knew each other from competing together for Germany under the Nazi regime

At the time, ski jumping was an amateur sport and the winners were given material prizes like portable radios or cooking pots.

The first competition was held on New Year's day, making it the only Four Hills tournament that did not start in December, although the New Year's day competition in Garmisch-Partenkirchen would eventually become traditional.

Participating nations and athletes

Results

Garmisch-Partenkirchen
 Große Olympiaschanze, Garmisch-Partenkirchen
01 January 1953

Oberstorf
 Schattenbergschanze, Oberstorf
04 January 1953

Innsbruck
 Bergiselschanze, Innsbruck
06 January 1953

Bischofshofen
 Paul-Ausserleitner-Schanze, Bischofshofen
11 January 1953

Before the last event, Sepp Bradl was leading the tournament ranking by only half a point ahead of Asgeir Dølplads, who in turn had a ten-point lead to fellow Norwegian Halvor Næs. In the competition however, it was Næs rather than Dølplads who put Bradl's tournament victory in danger. Winning the Bischofshofen event clearly, he reduced the distance to Bradl from 10.5 to 1.1 points but ultimately could not prevent him from becoming the first Four Hills winner.

Final ranking

References

External links
 FIS website
 Four Hills Tournament web site

 
1953 in ski jumping